Charles Skinner is a geologist who is Head of Group Exploration at diamond miners De Beers.

References

Living people
Year of birth missing (living people)
21st-century geologists
De Beers people